Joselito Perez Marquez (born Artemio Perez Marquez Jr.; October 7, 1957) better known as Joey Marquez, is a Filipino actor, comedian, politician and former professional basketball player in the Philippine Basketball Association. 

He was born to the late film director Artemio Marquez, Sr. and Teresita Esguera Perez. His siblings include Via Marquez Hoffman and Melanie Marquez. He was city mayor of Parañaque, Philippines from 1995 to 2004, and ran but lost the congressional race in May 2004. Marquez ran again as mayor of Parañaque in the 2010 elections, but lost to the city's incumbent mayor Florencio Bernabe, Jr. He is retired from politics and is focused on his TV and movie projects. He is a contract artist of ABS-CBN and GMA Network. Before embarking on a career as an actor-comedian, Marquez played for Presto Fun Drinks, later known as the Great Taste Coffee Makers, from 1981 to 1983 before moving to Gilbey's Gin Tonics, which would later be popularly known as Barangay Ginebra San Miguel, under legendary playing-coach Robert Jaworski beginning the 1984 season. He played briefly for Hills Bros. Coffee Kings in 1987 before leaving the game for good to become a full-time actor.

TV career
Marquez was one of the 1987 cast of seven in Palibhasa Lalake, the sitcom on Philippine television spanning 12 years, with Richard Gomez, Gloria Romero, Cynthia Patag, Amy Perez, Carmina Villarroel, and Apa Ongpin. Marquez was included in the S-Files roster of hosts after he successfully pinch-hit for Paolo Bediones when Paolo went to the US to interview some famous Hollywood celebrities to be featured on the show.

Filmography

Television

Films
 On The Job 2: The Missing 8 (Reality Entertainment, 2021)
Boyette: Not a Girl Yet (Star Cinema, 2020)
Papa Pogi (Regal Entertainment, 2019)
Sid & Aya: Not a Love Story (Viva Films, 2018) 
Haunted Forest (Regal Entertainment, 2017)
Woke Up Like This (Regal Entertainment, 2017)
My Ex and Whys (Star Cinema, 2017)
Kubot: The Aswang Chronicles (GMA Pictures, 2014) – "Official Entry To The 2014 Metro Manila Film Festival"
Girl, Boy, Bakla, Tomboy (Star Cinema & Viva Films, 2013) – "Official Entry To The 2013 Metro Manila Film Festival"
On the Job (Star Cinema, 2013)
Raketeros (Star Cinema, 2013)
Tiktik: The Aswang Chronicles (GMA Pictures, 2012) – Nestor
Catch Me, I'm in Love (Star Cinema & Viva Films, 2011)
I Wanna Be Happy (Seiko Films, 2006)
Utang ng Ama (Maverick Films, 2003)
As Boobs: Asal Bobo (Maverick Films, 2003)
Hey Babe! (1999)
Hari ng Yabang (Golden Tower Films, 1997) Tolome/Himself (Mayor)
Ging Gang Gooly Giddiyap I Love You Daddy (MAQ Productions, 1994) Don Arnaldo/King Arthur 
Mahal.... Saan ka natulog kagabi (Regal Entertainment, 1992)
Darna (Viva Films, 1991)
Shake, Rattle & Roll II (Regal Entertainment, 1990)
Bikining Itim (Viva Films, 1990)
Isang Araw, Walang Diyos (Regal Entertainment, 1989)
Tamis ng Unang Halik (Regal Entertainment, 1989)
Eastwood & Bronson (1989)
Stomach In, Chest Out (1988) - Sarhento
Bobo Cop (Regal Entertainment, 1988) - Renato Dalmacio
Kumander Gringa (1987)
Susuko Na Ba Ako, Inay? (Regal Entertainment, 1987)
Tagos ng Dugo (Regal Entertainment, 1987)

Video games
Barangay Basketball (Synergy 88 Studios, 2016)

Acting awards
Winner, Movie Supporting Actor of the Year for "On the Job" - 2014 Star Award
Winner, Best Supporting Actor for "Kubot: The Aswang Chronicles 2" - 2014 Metro Manila Film Festival

Political positions
Municipal Vice Mayor of Parañaque, 1992 to 1995
Municipal/City Mayor of Parañaque, 1995 to 2004

Educational background
College – Angeles University, BSC – Bachelor of Science in Commerce, major in Accounting

References

External links
IGMA.TV, Profile of Joey Marquez

21 Fabled athletes who headlined TV shows and films

1960 births
Living people
ABS-CBN personalities
Alaska Aces (PBA) players
Barangay Ginebra San Miguel players
Basketball players from Pampanga
Filipino actor-politicians
Filipino male comedians
Filipino men's basketball players
Filipino male film actors
Filipino male television actors
Filipino television directors
Filipino film directors
GMA Network personalities
Great Taste Coffee Makers players
Kapampangan people
Mayors of Parañaque
Participants in Philippine reality television series
People from Mabalacat